Leptotrachelus is a genus of ground beetles in the family Carabidae. There are more than 30 described species in Leptotrachelus.

Species
These 37 species belong to the genus Leptotrachelus:

 Leptotrachelus aequinoctialis (Chaudoir, 1848)  (Colombia)
 Leptotrachelus amplipennis Liebke, 1928  (Brazil)
 Leptotrachelus basalis (Perty, 1830)  (Brazil)
 Leptotrachelus brevicollis Boheman, 1858  (Argentina and Brazil)
 Leptotrachelus bruchi Liebke, 1928  (Argentina)
 Leptotrachelus compresus Zayas, 1988  (Cuba)
 Leptotrachelus cruciger Liebke, 1938  (Brazil)
 Leptotrachelus cubanus Zayas, 1988  (Cuba)
 Leptotrachelus debilis Chaudoir, 1872  (Brazil)
 Leptotrachelus depressus Blatchley, 1923  (North America)
 Leptotrachelus dilaticollis Bates, 1883  (Guatemala)
 Leptotrachelus dorsalis (Fabricius, 1801)  (North America)
 Leptotrachelus fulvicollis Reiche, 1842  (Colombia)
 Leptotrachelus fulvus Motschulsky, 1864  (Panama)
 Leptotrachelus fuscus Liebke, 1939  (Brazil)
 Leptotrachelus humeralis Liebke, 1928  (Paraguay)
 Leptotrachelus labrosus Liebke, 1928  (Brazil)
 Leptotrachelus laevigula Liebke, 1928  (Brazil)
 Leptotrachelus marginatus Brullé, 1834  (Brazil)
 Leptotrachelus mexicanus (Chaudoir, 1852)  (Mexico, Central and South America)
 Leptotrachelus nigriceps Chaudoir, 1872  (Brazil)
 Leptotrachelus nigripennis Liebke, 1928  (Surinam)
 Leptotrachelus pallens Motschulsky, 1864
 Leptotrachelus pallidipennis Chaudoir, 1872  (Brazil)
 Leptotrachelus pallidulus Motschulsky, 1864  (North America)
 Leptotrachelus parallelus Liebke, 1928  (Argentina)
 Leptotrachelus parcepunctatus Liebke, 1928  (Brazil)
 Leptotrachelus planicollis (Chaudoir, 1848)  (Brazil)
 Leptotrachelus planus Motschulsky, 1864  (Panama)
 Leptotrachelus plaumanni Liebke, 1938  (Brazil)
 Leptotrachelus punctaticeps Chaudoir, 1872  (Brazil)
 Leptotrachelus puncticollis Bates, 1878  (Central and South America)
 Leptotrachelus riedelii (Eschscholtz, 1829)  (Brazil)
 Leptotrachelus setulosus Liebke, 1928  (Brazil)
 Leptotrachelus striatopunctatus Chaudoir, 1872  (Brazil)
 Leptotrachelus suturalis Laporte, 1832  (Central and South America)
 Leptotrachelus testaceus Dejean, 1831  (Mexico, Central and South America)

References

External links

 

Ctenodactylinae